Love's in You, Love's in Me is a 1978 album composed, produced and performed by Giorgio Moroder and Chris Bennett.

Track listing
All tracks composed by Giorgio Moroder and Pete Bellotte
"Love's in You, Love's in Me" - 3:46
"Keep It Together" - 3:32
"I Can't Wait" - 4:15
"Reprise" - 5:07
"Love Now, Hurt Later" - 6:10
"Burning the Midnight Oil" - 4:56
"Let This Night Go On for Days" - 6:00

Personnel
Giorgio Moroder - producer
Bob Esty, Geoff Bastow, Harold Faltermeyer, Keith Forsey, Les Hurdle, Thor Baldursson - musicians
Claudia Schwarz, Gitta Walther, Lucy O'Neale - choir
Dan Wyman - Moog programming

Giorgio Moroder albums
1978 albums
Albums produced by Giorgio Moroder
Casablanca Records albums